The 2018 United States House of Representatives elections in New Hampshire were held on November 6, 2018, to elect the two U.S. representatives from the state of New Hampshire, one from each of the state's two congressional districts. The elections coincided with other elections to the House of Representatives, elections to the United States Senate and various state and local elections.

Following the 2018 elections, the Democratic Party retained both of New Hampshire's House seats in Congress, and thus maintained control of all of New Hampshire's Congressional (House and Senate) delegation.

Overview
Results of the 2018 United States House of Representatives elections in New Hampshire by district:

District 1

The 1st district covers the southeastern part of the state and consists of three general areas: Greater Manchester, the Seacoast and the Lakes Region. The incumbent going into the election was Democrat Carol Shea-Porter, who had represented the district since 2017 and previously from 2007 to 2011 and 2013 to 2015. She was elected with 44% of the vote in 2016, defeating Republican incumbent Frank Guinta. She did not run for reelection in 2018.

Democratic primary

Candidates

Nominee
 Chris Pappas, Executive Councilor of New Hampshire for the 4th District

Lost in primary
Naomi Andrews, former aide to Carol Shea-Porter
 Paul Cardinal, businessman
 Mark MacKenzie, state representative and former president of the New Hampshire AFL-CIO
 William Martin
 Deaglan McEachern, businessman
 Mindi Messmer, state representative
 Terence M. O'Rourke, current Rochester City Attorney; former Assistant United States Attorney and Assistant County Attorney; Iraq War veteran  (no relation to Beto O'Rourke)
 Levi Sanders, son of U.S. Senator Bernie Sanders
 Lincoln Soldati, former mayor of Somersworth and former Strafford County Attorney
 Maura Sullivan, former Assistant to the Secretary of Defense for Public Affairs, former U.S. Marine Corps Officer and Iraq War veteran

Declined
 Jackie Cilley, state representative and candidate for governor in 2012
 Terie Norelli, state representative and former Speaker of the New Hampshire House of Representatives
 Carol Shea-Porter, incumbent representative
 David Watters, state senator

Endorsements

Primary results

Republican primary

Candidates

Nominee
 Eddie Edwards, former Chief of the New Hampshire State Division of Liquor Enforcement and former South Hampton Police Chief

Lost in primary
 Michael Callis
 Jeff Denaro, contractor
 Andy Martin, perennial candidate
 Andy Sanborn, state senator

Withdrew
 Bruce Crochetiere, businessman

Declined
 Dan Innis, state senator and candidate for this seat in 2014
 John Stephen, former commissioner of the New Hampshire Department of Health & Human Services, candidate for this seat in 2002 and 2008 and nominee for governor in 2010

Endorsements

Primary results

Libertarian primary

Candidates

Declared
 Dan Belforti

Independent candidates

Declared

 Eric R. Eastman, Justice Progressive candidate, former state representative, actor and director.

General election

Polling

Results

District 2

The 2nd district covers the western and northern parts of the state and includes the cities of Nashua and Concord. The incumbent is Democrat Ann McLane Kuster, who has represented the district since 2013. She was re-elected with 49.7% of the vote in 2016.

Democratic primary

Candidates 
 Annie Kuster, incumbent Representative

Primary results

Republican primary

Candidates

Declared
Brian Belanger, businessman
Gerard Beloin
Lynne Blankenbeker, former state representative
Robert Burns, former Hillsborough County Treasurer
Stewart Levenson, doctor and whistleblower
Jay Mercer
Steve Negron, state representative

Withdrew 
 Jack Flanagan, former Majority Leader of the New Hampshire House of Representatives and candidate for this seat in 2016

Declined 
 Josh McElveen, political director and news anchor for WMUR-TV

Endorsements

Primary results

Libertarian primary

Candidates

Declared
Justin O'Donnell, Libertarian Activist, Member of The Libertarian National Committee, Sales Consultant and National Guard Veteran
Tom Alciere, former Republican state representative

Primary results

General election

Polling

Results

See also
 United States House of Representatives elections, 2016
 United States elections, 2016

References

External links
Candidates at Vote Smart 
Candidates at Ballotpedia 
Campaign finance at FEC 
Campaign finance at OpenSecrets

Official campaign websites for first district candidates
Dan Belforti (L) for Congress
Nansi Boutwell Craig (I) for Congress
Eddie Edwards (R) for Congress
Chris Pappas (D) for Congress

Official campaign websites for second district candidates
Ann McLane Kuster (D) for Congress
Gary Moody (I) for Congress
Steve Negron (R) for Congress
Justin O'Donnell (L) for Congress

2018
New Hampshire
United States House of Representatives